Tau Ceti, Latinized from τ Ceti, is a single star in the constellation Cetus that is spectrally similar to the Sun, although it has only about 78% of the Sun's mass. At a distance of just under  from the Solar System, it is a relatively nearby star and the closest solitary G-class star. The star appears stable, with little stellar variation, and is metal-deficient relative to the Sun.

It can be seen with the unaided eye with an apparent magnitude of 3.5. As seen from Tau Ceti, the Sun would be in the northern hemisphere constellation Boötes with an apparent magnitude of about 2.6.

Observations have detected more than ten times as much dust surrounding Tau Ceti as is present in the Solar System. Since December 2012, there has been evidence of at least four planets—all confirmed as super-Earths—orbiting Tau Ceti, with two of these being potentially in the habitable zone. There are an additional four unconfirmed planets, one of which is a Jovian planet between 3 and 20 AU from the star. Because of its debris disk, any planet orbiting Tau Ceti would face far more impact events than Earth. Despite this hurdle to habitability, its solar analog (Sun-like) characteristics have led to widespread interest in the star. Given its stability, similarity and relative proximity to the Sun, Tau Ceti is consistently listed as a target for the Search for Extra-Terrestrial Intelligence (SETI) and appears in some science fiction literature.

Name
The name "Tau Ceti" is the Bayer designation for this star, established in 1603 as part of German celestial cartographer Johann Bayer's Uranometria star catalogue: it is "number T" in Bayer's sequence of constellation Cetus. In the catalogue of stars in the Calendarium of Al Achsasi al Mouakket, written at Cairo about 1650, this star was designated Thālith al Naʽāmāt (ثالث النعامات - thālith al-naʽāmāt), which was translated into Latin as Tertia Struthionum, meaning the third of the ostriches. This star, along with η Cet (Deneb Algenubi), θ Cet (Thanih Al Naamat), ζ Cet (Baten Kaitos), and υ Cet, were Al Naʽāmāt (النعامات), the Hen Ostriches.

In Chinese astronomy, the "Square Celestial Granary" refers to an asterism consisting of τ Ceti, ι Ceti, η Ceti, ζ Ceti, θ Ceti and 57 Ceti. Consequently, the Chinese name for τ Ceti itself is "the Fifth Star of Square Celestial Granary".

Motion
The proper motion of a star is its rate of movement across the celestial sphere, determined by comparing its position relative to more distant background objects. Tau Ceti is considered to be a high-proper-motion star, although it only has an annual traverse of just under 2 arc seconds. Thus it will require about 2000 years before the location of this star shifts by more than a degree. A high proper motion is an indicator of closeness to the Sun. Nearby stars can traverse an angle of arc across the sky more rapidly than the distant background stars and are good candidates for parallax studies. This makes it one of the closest star systems to the Sun and the next-closest spectral class-G star after Alpha Centauri A.

The radial velocity of a star is the component of its motion that is toward or away from the Sun. Unlike proper motion, a star's radial velocity cannot be directly observed, but can be determined by measuring its spectrum. Due to the Doppler shift, the absorption lines in the spectrum of a star will be shifted slightly toward the red (or longer wavelengths) if the star is moving away from the observer, or toward blue (or shorter wavelengths) when it moves toward the observer. In the case of Tau Ceti, the radial velocity is about −17 km/s, with the negative value indicating that it is moving toward the Sun. The star will make its closest approach to the Sun in about 43,000 years, when it comes to within .

The distance to Tau Ceti, along with its proper motion and radial velocity, together give the motion of the star through space. This result can then be used to compute an orbital path of Tau Ceti through the Milky Way.

Physical properties

The Tau Ceti system is believed to have only one stellar component. A dim optical companion has been observed with magnitude 13.1. As of 2000, it was  distant from the primary. It may be gravitationally bound, but it is considered more likely to be a line-of-sight coincidence.

Most of what is known about the physical properties of Tau Ceti and its system has been determined through spectroscopic measurements. By comparing the spectrum to computed models of stellar evolution, the age, mass, radius and luminosity of Tau Ceti can be estimated. However, using an astronomical interferometer, measurements of the radius of the star can be made directly to an accuracy of 0.5%. Through such means, the radius of Tau Ceti has been measured to be  of the solar radius. This is about the size that is expected for a star with somewhat lower mass than the Sun.

Rotation

The rotation period for Tau Ceti was measured by periodic variations in the classic H and K absorption lines of singly ionized calcium (Ca II). These lines are closely associated with surface magnetic activity, so the period of variation measures the time required for the activity sites to complete a full rotation about the star. By this means the rotation period for Tau Ceti is estimated to be . Due to the Doppler effect, the rotation rate of a star affects the width of the absorption lines in the spectrum (light from the side of the star moving away from the observer will be shifted to a longer wavelength; light from the side moving towards the observer will be shifted toward a shorter wavelength). By analyzing the width of these lines, the rotational velocity of a star can be estimated. The projected rotation velocity for Tau Ceti is

where veq is the velocity at the equator, and i is the inclination angle of the rotation axis to the line of sight. The relatively low rotational velocity measurements may indicate that Tau Ceti is being viewed from nearly the direction of its pole.

Metallicity

The chemical composition of a star provides important clues to its evolutionary history, including the age at which it formed. The interstellar medium of dust and gas from which stars form is primarily composed of hydrogen and helium with trace amounts of heavier elements. As nearby stars continually evolve and die, they seed the interstellar medium with an increasing portion of heavier elements. Thus younger stars tend to have a higher portion of heavy elements in their atmospheres than do the older stars. These heavy elements are termed "metals" by astronomers, and the portion of heavy elements is the metallicity. The amount of metallicity in a star is given in terms of the ratio of iron (Fe), an easily observed heavy element, to hydrogen. A logarithm of the relative iron abundance is compared to the Sun. In the case of Tau Ceti, the atmospheric metallicity is

 dex,

equivalent to about a third the solar abundance. Past measurements have varied from −0.13 to −0.60.

This lower abundance of iron indicates that Tau Ceti is almost certainly older than the Sun.

Besides rotation, another factor that can widen the absorption features in the spectrum of a star is pressure broadening. The presence of nearby particles affects the radiation emitted by an individual particle. So the line width is dependent on the surface pressure of the star, which in turn is determined by the temperature and surface gravity. This technique was used to determine the surface gravity of Tau Ceti.

Luminosity and variability
The luminosity of Tau Ceti is equal to only 55% of the Sun's luminosity. This is approximately the same as the average distance between Venus and the Sun.

The chromosphere of Tau Ceti—the portion of a star's atmosphere just above the light-emitting photosphere—currently displays little or no magnetic activity, indicating a stable star. One 9-year study of temperature, granulation, and the chromosphere showed no systematic variations; Ca II emissions around the H and K infrared bands show a possible 11-year cycle, but this is weak relative to the Sun. Alternatively it has been suggested that the star could be in a low-activity state analogous to a Maunder minimum—a historical period, associated with the Little Ice Age in Europe, when sunspots became exceedingly rare on the Sun's surface. Spectral line profiles of Tau Ceti are extremely narrow, indicating low turbulence and observed rotation. The star's asteroseismological oscillations have an amplitude about half that of the Sun and a lower mode lifetime.

Planetary system

Principal factors driving research interest in Tau Ceti are its proximity, its Sun-like characteristics, and the implications for possible life on its planets. For categorization purposes, Hall and Lockwood report that "the terms 'solarlike star', 'solar analog', and 'solar twin' [are] progressively restrictive descriptions". Tau Ceti fits the second category, given its similar mass and low variability, but relative lack of metals. The similarities have inspired popular culture references for decades, as well as scientific examination.

In 1988, radial-velocity observations ruled out any periodical variations attributable to massive planets around Tau Ceti inside of Jupiter-like distances. Ever more precise measurements continue to rule out such planets, at least until December 2012. The velocity precision reached is about 11 m/s measured over a 5-year time span. This result excludes hot Jupiters and probably excludes any planets with minimal mass greater than or equal to Jupiter's mass and with orbital periods less than 15 years. In addition, a survey of nearby stars by the Hubble Space Telescope's Wide Field and Planetary Camera was completed in 1999, including a search for faint companions to Tau Ceti; none were discovered to limits of the telescope's resolving power.

However, these searches only excluded larger brown dwarf bodies and closer orbiting giant planets, so smaller, Earth-like planets in orbit around the star, like those discovered in 2012, were not precluded. If hot Jupiters were to exist in close orbit, they would likely disrupt the star's habitable zone; their exclusion was thus considered positive for the possibility of Earth-like planets. General research has shown a positive correlation between the presence of planets and a relatively high-metallicity parent star, suggesting that stars with lower metallicity such as Tau Ceti have a lower chance of having planets.

Discovery
On December 19, 2012, evidence was presented that suggested a system of five planets orbiting Tau Ceti. The planets' estimated minimal masses were between 2 and 6 Earth masses, with orbital periods ranging from 14 to 640 days. One of them, Tau Ceti e, appears to orbit about half as far from Tau Ceti as Earth does from the Sun. With Tau Ceti's luminosity of 52% that of the Sun and a distance from the star of 0.552 AU, the planet would receive 1.71 times as much stellar radiation as Earth does, slightly less than Venus with 1.91 times Earth's. Nevertheless, some research places it within the star's habitable zone. The Planetary Habitability Laboratory has estimated that Tau Ceti f, which receives 28.5% as much starlight as Earth, would be within the star's habitable zone, albeit narrowly.

The discovery team refined their methodology, improved their radial-velocity measurements, and published their new results in August 2017. They confirmed Tau Ceti e and f as candidates but failed to consistently detect planets b (which may be a false negative), c (whose weakly defined apparent signal was correlated to stellar rotation), and d (which did not show up in all data sets). Instead, they found two new planetary candidates, g and h, with orbits of 20 and 49 days. The signals detected from the candidate planets have radial velocities as low as 30 cm/s, and the experimental method used in their detection, as it was applied to HARPS, could in theory have detected down to around 20 cm/s. The updated 4-planet model is dynamically packed and potentially stable for billions of years.

However, with further refinements, even more candidate planets have been detected. In 2019, a paper published in Astronomy & Astrophysics suggested that Tau Ceti could have a Jupiter or super-Jupiter based on a tangential astrometric velocity of around 11.3 m/s. The exact size and position of this conjectured object have not been determined, though it is at most 5 Jupiter masses if it orbits between 3 and 20 AU. A 2020 Astronomical Journal study by astronomers Jeremy Dietrich and Daniel Apai analyzed the orbital stability of the known planets and, considering statistical patterns identified from hundreds of other planetary systems, explored the orbits in which the presence of additional, yet-undetected planets are most likely. This analysis predicted three planet candidates at orbits coinciding with planet candidates b, c, and d. The close match between the independently predicted planet periods and the periods of the three planet candidates previously identified in radial velocity data strongly supports the genuine planet nature of candidates b, c, and d. Furthermore, the study also predicts at least one yet-undetected planet between planets e and f, i.e., within the habitable zone. This predicted exoplanet is identified as PxP-4.

If Tau Ceti is aligned in such a way that it is nearly pole-on to Earth (as its rotation could indicate), its planets would be less similar to Earth's mass and more to Neptune, Saturn, or Jupiter. For example, were Tau Ceti f's orbit inclined 70 degrees from being face-on to Earth, its mass would be  Earth masses, making it a middle-to-low end super-Earth.

Tau Ceti e 

Tau Ceti e is a confirmed planet orbiting Tau Ceti that was detected by statistical analyses of the data of the star's variations in radial velocity that were obtained using HIRES, AAPS, and HARPS. Its possible properties were refined in 2017: it orbits at a distance of 0.552 AU (between the orbits of Venus and Mercury in the Solar System) with an orbital period of 168 days and has a minimum mass of 3.93 Earth masses. Based upon the incident flux upon the planet, a study by Güdel et al. (2014) speculated that the planet may lie outside the habitable zone and closer to a Venus-like world.

Tau Ceti f 

Tau Ceti f is a confirmed super-Earth orbiting Tau Ceti that was discovered in 2012 by statistical analyses of the star's variations in radial velocity, based on data obtained using HIRES, AAPS, and HARPS. It is of interest because its orbit places it in Tau Ceti's extended habitable zone. However, a 2015 study implies that it has been in the temperate zone for less than one billion years, so there may not be a detectable biosignature.

Few properties of the planet are known other than its orbit and mass. It orbits Tau Ceti at a distance of 1.35 AU (near Mars's orbit in the Solar System) with an orbital period of 642 days and has a minimum mass of 3.93 Earth masses.

Debris disk
In 2004, a team of UK astronomers led by Jane Greaves discovered that Tau Ceti has more than ten times the amount of cometary and asteroidal material orbiting it than does the Sun. This was determined by measuring the disk of cold dust orbiting the star produced by collisions between such small bodies. This result puts a damper on the possibility of complex life in the system, because any planets would suffer from large impact events roughly ten times more frequently than Earth. Greaves noted at the time of her research that "it is likely that [any planets] will experience constant bombardment from asteroids of the kind believed to have wiped out the dinosaurs". Such bombardments would inhibit the development of biodiversity between impacts. However, it is possible that a large Jupiter-sized gas giant (such as the proposed planet "i") could deflect comets and asteroids.

The debris disk was discovered by measuring the amount of radiation emitted by the system in the far infrared portion of the spectrum. The disk forms a symmetric feature that is centered on the star, and its outer radius averages . To be maintained over a long period of time, this ring of dust must be constantly replenished through collisions by larger bodies. The bulk of the disk appears to be orbiting Tau Ceti at a distance of 35–, well outside the orbit of the habitable zone. At this distance, the dust belt may be analogous to the Kuiper belt that lies outside the orbit of Neptune in the Solar System.

Tau Ceti shows that stars need not lose large disks as they age, and such a thick belt may not be uncommon among Sun-like stars. Tau Ceti's belt is only 1/20 as dense as the belt around its young neighbor, Epsilon Eridani. The relative lack of debris around the Sun may be the unusual case: one research-team member suggests the Sun may have passed close to another star early in its history and had most of its comets and asteroids stripped away. Stars with large debris disks have changed the way astronomers think about planet formation because debris disk stars, where dust is continually generated by collisions, appear to form planets readily.

Habitability

Tau Ceti's habitable zone—the locations where liquid water could be present on an Earth-sized planet—spans a radius of 0.55–1.16 AU, where 1 AU is the average distance from the Earth to the Sun. Primitive life on Tau Ceti's planets may reveal itself through an analysis of atmospheric composition via spectroscopy, if the composition is unlikely to be abiotic, just as oxygen on Earth is indicative of life.

The most optimistic search project to date was Project Ozma, which was intended to "search for extraterrestrial intelligence" (SETI) by examining selected stars for indications of artificial radio signals. It was run by the astronomer Frank Drake, who selected Tau Ceti and Epsilon Eridani as the initial targets. Both are located near the Solar System and are physically similar to the Sun. No artificial signals were found despite 200 hours of observations. Subsequent radio searches of this star system have turned up negative.

This lack of results has not dampened interest in observing the Tau Ceti system for biosignatures. In 2002, astronomers Margaret Turnbull and Jill Tarter developed the Catalog of Nearby Habitable Systems (HabCat) under the auspices of Project Phoenix, another SETI endeavour. The list contained more than  theoretically habitable systems, approximately 10% of the original sample. The next year, Turnbull would further refine the list to the 30 most promising systems out of  within 100 light-years from the Sun, including Tau Ceti; this will form part of the basis of radio searches with the Allen Telescope Array. She chose Tau Ceti for a final shortlist of just five stars suitable for searches by the (now cancelled) Terrestrial Planet Finder telescope system, commenting that "these are places I'd want to live if God were to put our planet around another star".

See also
 Epsilon Eridani
 List of nearest stars and brown dwarfs
 List of potentially habitable exoplanets
 List of nearest terrestrial exoplanet candidates
 Tau Ceti in fiction

Notes

References

Further reading

External links

 Near Star Catalog
 Tau Ceti at Jim Kaler's STARS site
 Tau Ceti: Life Amidst Catastrophe? at Centauri Dreams

 

G-type main-sequence stars
Ceti, Tau
Maunder Minimum

Ceti, Tau
Cetus (constellation)
Circumstellar disks
BD-16 0295
Ceti, 52
0071
010700
008102
0509
Thālith al Naʽāmāt
Planetary systems with four confirmed planets